Taupye is a village in Central District of Botswana. It is located 15 km east of Mahalapye and the population was 402 in 2001 census.

References

Populated places in Central District (Botswana)
Villages in Botswana